Wyburn is a surname. Notable people with the surname include:

George Wyburn (1903–1985), British embryologist
Nathan Wyburn (born 1989), Welsh artist and media personality
Rhoda Wyburn (1841–1934), English milliner